Giulia Crostarosa (31 October 1696 – 14 September 1755) was an Italian Roman Catholic nun who founded the Order of the Most Holy Redeemer (Redemptoristines). She reported a series of visions that led to the establishment of a congregation with its own rule. She assumed the religious name of "Maria Celeste" when she became a professed nun.

Pope Francis declared her to be Venerable for her life of heroic virtue on 3 June 2013; a miracle attributed to her intercession was approved in 2015 which paved the path for her beatification, which took place on 18 June 2016 in Foggia with Cardinal Angelo Amato presiding on the behalf of the pope.

Life
Giulia Crostarosa was born on 31 October 1696 in Naples with the baptismal name of Giulia Marcella Crostarosa. She was the tenth of twelve children born to Francesco Crostarosa and Paola Battistini Caldari; descended from the Lords of Abruzzo and Aquila.

Crostarosa was immersed in spiritual life and collaborated with Father Bartolomeo Cacace who served as her spiritual director. As an adolescent she accompanied her sister Ursula to Marigliano to become a nun in 1716. While there she met Father Thomas Falcoia of the Pious Workers who served as a spiritual assistant following the death of Cacace. She remained in the convent for under a decade and in 1724 relocated along with her sister to enter a religious conservatory founded by Falcoia in Scala, high above the Bay of Amalfi. 

Her first recorded vision of Jesus Christ was on 25 April 1725 when she was still a novice, in which she saw for the first time what would soon become the congregation she would establish. Crostarosa wrote down the rule and showed it to Falcoia, the director of the convent. He submitted the new Rule to a number of theologians, who approved of it, and said it might be adopted in the convent of Scala, provided the community would accept it. However, the mother superior objected and Falcoia's general superior of the "Pius Workers", forbade any change of rule and removed Falcoia from all communication with the convent. In October, 1730, Falcoia was consecrated Bishop of Castellamare, and free, subject to the approval of the Bishop of Scala, to act with regard to the convent as he thought best.

Alphonsus Liguori, a friend of Falcoia, gave a retreat to the nuns at Scala and obtained permission from the Bishop of Scala for the change. In 1731, the convent unanimously adopted the new Rule, together with a habit of red and blue, the traditional colours of Our Lord's own clothes. After she became a nun she assumed the name of "Maria Celeste". 

Crostarosa left Scala in 1733 and went to Nocera Inferiore. It was in Foggia on 19 March 1738 that she established the Redemptoristine Nuns. She served as the order's superior for under two decades. She had the esteem of Liguori and Gerard Majella.

Giulia Crostarosa died in Foggia on 14 September 1755. Her spiritual experiences are contained in numerous documents of considerable value following her death as well as those she kept during her life.

Beatification process
The beatification process opened in Foggia on 11 August 1901. Pope Francis approved the findings of the Congregation for the Causes of Saints and proclaimed her to be Venerable on 3 June 2013 on the account of her heroic virtues.

A miracle attributed to her intercession was investigated on a local level and was validated on 6 December 2013. The pope approved the miracle on 14 December 2015. Cardinal Angelo Amato presided over the beatification on 18 June 2016 in Foggia on the pope's behalf.

References

External links
CatholicSaints.Info
Monastero Crostarosa

1696 births
1755 deaths
18th-century venerated Christians
18th-century Italian Roman Catholic religious sisters and nuns
Beatifications by Pope Francis
Founders of Catholic religious communities
Religious leaders from Naples
Beatified Redemptorists
Italian beatified people
Venerated Catholics by Pope Francis
18th-century Neapolitan people